This article contains information about the literary events and publications of 1810.

Events
February – The eccentric English amateur actor Robert Coates makes his début in a favourite role: Romeo, at the Theatre Royal, Bath.
April 10 – Percy Bysshe Shelley matriculates at University College, Oxford. His atheistic Gothic novella Zastrozzi: A Romance, written while still a schoolboy at Eton, is published this year under his initials in London. Its successor, St. Irvyne; or, The Rosicrucian: A Romance, is published as "By a Gentleman of the University of Oxford" in December (dated 1811) in London by J. J. Stockdale. In September, Shelley publishes through Stockdale Original Poetry by Victor and Cazire, co-written with his sister Elizabeth before he came up to Oxford, but withdrawn due to plagiarism of one poem. In November he and a friend, Thomas Jefferson Hogg, publish the burlesque Posthumous Fragments of Margaret Nicholson; Being Poems found amongst the Papers of that Noted Female who attempted the Life of the King in 1786 "Edited by John Fitzvictor" in Oxford.
unknown dates
Germaine de Staël's study of Germany De l'Allemagne is published in Paris but suppressed by order of Napoleon.
A collection, The British Novelists, with an introductory essay and prefaces by Anna Laetitia Barbauld, appears in 50 volumes in London from F. C. & J. Rivington.

New books

Fiction
Catherine Cuthbertson – The Forest of Montalbano
Sarah Green – The Festival of St. Jago
Lady Mary Hamilton – The Duc de Popoli
Ann Hatton – Cambrian Pictures
Robert Huish – The Mysteries of Ferney Castle
Emma Parker – A Soldier's Offspring
Jane Porter – The Scottish Chiefs
Jan Potocki – The Manuscript Found in Saragossa (Manuscrit trouvé à Saragosse, 2nd version)
Regina Marie Roche – The Houses of Osma and Almeria; or, Convent of St. Ildefonso: a Tale
Percy Bysshe Shelley – Zastrozzi
Louisa Stanhope
Di Montranzo
The Novice of Corpus Domini
Catherine George Ward – The Daughter of St Omar
Jane West – The Refusal

Drama
Joanna Baillie – The Family Legend
James Sheridan Knowles – Leo; or, The Gipsy
Adam Oehlenschläger – Axel og Valborg
Heinrich von Kleist – The Prince of Homburg (Prinz Friedrich von Homburg oder die Schlacht bei Fehrbellin, written)

Poetry
George Crabbe – The Borough
Mary Russell Mitford – Poems
Walter Scott –  The Lady of the Lake
Percy Bysshe Shelley
with Elizabeth Shelley – Original Poetry by Victor and Cazire
with Thomas Jefferson Hogg – Posthumous Fragments of Margaret Nicholson

Non-fiction
Lucy Aikin – Epistles on Women, Exemplifying their Character and Condition in Various Ages and Nations, with Miscellaneous Poems
Johann Wolfgang von Goethe – Zur Farbenlehre (Theory of Colours)
Mirza Abu Taleb Khan (tr. Charles Stewart)  – Travels of Mirza Abu Taleb Khan in Asia, Africa and Europe
Germaine de Staël – De l'Allemagne
William Wordsworth – Guide to the Lakes

Births
February 10 – Giulietta Pezzi, Italian novelist, journalist, and poet (died 1878)
 March 10 – Samuel Ferguson, Northern Irish lawyer, poet and artist (died 1886)
March 28 – Alexandre Herculano, Portuguese writer and historian (died 1877)
April 8 – Hégésippe Moreau, French writer and poet (died 1838)
May 10 – E. Cobham Brewer, English lexicographer (died 1897)
May 11 – Caroline Fox, English diarist (died 1870)
May 23 – Margaret Fuller American feminist writer (drowned 1850)
August 6 – William Ticknor, American publisher (died 1864)
August 15 – Louise Colet, French poet (died 1876)
August 29 – Juan Bautista Alberdi, Argentinian politician and writer (died 1884)
August 31 – František Doucha, Czech writer and translator (died 1884)
September 22 – John Brown, Scottish physician and essayist (died 1882)
September 29 – Elizabeth Gaskell, English novelist (died 1865)
December 11 – Alfred de Musset, French poet (died 1857)

Deaths
February 9 – Richard Chandler, English antiquary (born 1738)
February 22 – Charles Brockden Brown, American novelist (born 1771; tuberculosis)
March 14 – Ludwig Timotheus Spittler, German historian (born 1752)
April 3 – Twm o'r Nant, Welsh-language dramatist and poet (born 1739)
May 1 – Christoph Meiners, German philosopher (born 1747)
May 17 – Robert Tannahill, Scottish poet (born 1774)
May 26 – Catharina Heybeek, Dutch journalist, feminist and editor (born 1764)
December 15 – Sarah Trimmer, English children's writer and critic (born 1741)

References

 
Years of the 19th century in literature